Caetano Rossario Silva is an Indian politician. He was elected to the Goa Legislative Assembly from Benaulim in the 2012 Goa Legislative Assembly election as a member of the Goa Vikas Party. He joined Indian National Congress in April 2019.

References

Living people
People from Benaulim
Goa MLAs 2012–2017
Indian National Congress politicians from Goa
Goa Vikas Party politicians
Year of birth missing (living people)